"Blue Skies" is a song by American electronica artist BT with featured vocals by Tori Amos. Released as a single in the United Kingdom in October 1996, it hit number one on the United States Hot Dance Music/Club Play chart in January 1997. "Blue Skies" also appears on the Party of Five soundtrack. Many versions (remixes) of the song exist.

While originally announced for BT's follow-up album, ESCM, it was later appended to the double-disc reissue of his first album, Ima.

In the album notes for BT's 10 Years in the Life compilation, BT says that Tori Amos performed 15 minutes of improvisational singing over his track "Divinity", which later became the vocals for "Blue Skies". He says that Tori never sang the words "blue" or "skies" in the recording. He joined together syllables and breaths to make new words through editing.

The 'Delphinium Days' mix samples lines and sounds from Derek Jarman's experimental film Blue (1993). The title 'Delphinium days' is a reference to lines from that film.

Track listing

Charts

See also
 List of number-one dance singles of 1997 (U.S.)

References

1996 singles
Tori Amos songs
1996 songs
BT (musician) songs